Castello Baglioni (Italian for Baglioni Castle)  is a fortified palace in Civitella Messer Raimondo, Province of Chieti (Abruzzo).

History

Architecture

References

Baglioni
Civitella Messer Raimondo